Biltmore Hardware Building is a historic commercial building located at Biltmore Village, Asheville, Buncombe County, North Carolina. It was built in 1923, and is a two-story, rectangular brick structure, with a one-story wing added in 1927. It has a central doorway flanked by storefronts.  It was the home of Biltmore Hardware, a business that existed in Biltmore Village from about 1936 to 2000.

It was listed on the National Register of Historic Places in 2003.

References

Commercial buildings on the National Register of Historic Places in North Carolina
Commercial buildings completed in 1923
Buildings and structures in Asheville, North Carolina
National Register of Historic Places in Buncombe County, North Carolina